Viasat Sport 3 was a Scandinavian sports channel mainly showing basketball, combat sports, auto racing and American football. The channel started on 1 February 2004 together with Viasat Sport 2. The main sports in the summer are NASCAR, Indy Racing League, Boxing, Euroleague. 

Viasat Sport 3 also had the rights to the soccer club TV channel Blackburn Rovers TV. 

The channel was available in Norway, Sweden, Denmark, Finland, Estonia, Lithuania and Latvia along with its sister channel Viasat Sport 2. On 16 October 2008, Viasat relaunched their sports channels in Norway and Sweden. Viasat Sport 3 was replaced by Viasat Motor in both Sweden and Norway. The channels did however continue in Denmark, Finland and the Baltics until 6 January 2009. In the Baltics, the channels were replaced by Viasat Sport Baltic, while there were no replacements in Denmark and Finland.

References 

V Sport
Modern Times Group
Television channels and stations established in 2004
Television channels and stations disestablished in 2009
Defunct television channels in Sweden
Defunct television channels in Norway
Defunct television channels in Denmark
Defunct television channels in Finland
Defunct television channels in Estonia